Anand Kumar (born 10 December 1970) is an Indian film director, writer and the founder Anand Kumar Productions pvt ltd. He was born and brought up in Delhi. He started his career in film making with Delhii Heights in 2007 featuring Jimmy Shergill and Neha Dhupia which was produced by Sivaji Productions as their first venture into Mumbai Film Industry. Delhii Heights was directed and written by him. His other movies are Jugaad (2009) featuring Manoj Bajpai and Zila Ghaziabad (2013) featuring Sanjay Dutt, Arshad Warsi, Vivek Oberoi and Minisha Lamba.

Early life
Anand Kumar was born in a Malayali family in Delhi. His parents did not belong to any creative field whatsoever. His father is a Lawyer in Delhi High Court and mother is a housewife.  He received his education from DTEA Sr Secondary School, Lodhi Estate, New Delhi. He was a college dropout from MDU Law College, Rohtak.  He spent a few years in Hyderabad where he pursued his mass Communication course and thereafter got opportunity to work for various ad films, music, videos and documentaries in Mumbai, Delhi and Chandigarh.

Filmography

About Anand Kumar Productions
It works on the process of producing motion pictures, video content for television, social media, corporate promotions, commercials and other media-related fields. AKPPL takes special interest in discovering talented artists be it from theater or televisions, who are independent of major studios, record labels, or other commercial channels of distribution and performances.

In 2014, AKPPL released its first Action based film, Desi Kattey. The film starred Suniel Shetty, Jay Bhanushali, sasha agha, Akhil Kapoor (debutant)and Tia Bajpai received mixed reviews.

The production house is now gearing up for the Biopic of “Bhaichung Bhutia”     and an Action Thriller “Meerut Junction”  .. "

References

External links
 

Living people
Film directors from Delhi
1970 births